The men's 73 kg competition at the 2019 World Weightlifting Championships was held on 21 September 2019.

Schedule

Medalists

Records

Results

New records

References

Results 

Men's 73 kg